Pleiosaur is a misspelling of either of two types of extinct marine reptiles:

 Plesiosaur
 Pliosaur